Sezzle is a publicly traded financial technology company headquartered in Minneapolis, U.S operating in the United States and Canada. The company provides an alternative payment platform offering interest-free installment plans at selected online stores.  the Sezzle platform had over 10 million user sign-ups and over 48,000 participating merchants.

History 
Sezzle was founded in 2016, by Charlie Youakim (currently CEO), who had previously led Charlotte-based Passport Parking, Paul Paradis (President), and Killian Brackey (CTO) in Minneapolis, U.S. Sezzle raised over US$17 million in equity capital prior to its IPO, where it raised an additional US$30 million. The company also has a US$100 million debt facility from Bastion capital.

Sezzle's initial product was next-business-day ACH payments and a cashback reward system. Sezzle later iterated to a “buy now, pay later” model in 2017 after witnessing success in the growing industry. Sezzle launched its product to the United States in August 2017. It raised US$9.1 million in mid-2018 and gained a US$100 million debt financing from Bastion Capital Corporation by the end of the year. At that time, it hired former US Bank executive Karen Hartje as its Chief Financial Officer and former Target and TD Bank executive Jamie Kirkpatrick as its Chief Risk Officer.

In April 2019, Sezzle raised US$5.7 million, partnered with Bank of America Merchant Services to implement their digital card processing solution within the payment platform, and expanded to Canada a few months later, opening its headquarters in Toronto, Ontario. Sezzle listed on the Australian Securities Exchange at AU$1.22 a share on 30 July 2019 and raised US$30 million. In December 2019, it gained a US$100 million line of credit.

In February 2020, Sezzle announced that it topped 1 million active customers.

On 1 June 2020, Sezzle reincorporated as a Public Benefit Corporation, making Sezzle the first “buy now, pay later” corporation with such a status. Later that summer, the company raised US$55 million from its equity in the ASX, and hired former PayPal executive Veronica Katz as its Chief Revenue Officer, while Paradis became the company's first President.

On 6 August 2020, Sezzle CEO Charlie Youakim said the company is testing its service offering in India, with an expected launch at the end of the year. The move would mark its first major expansion outside of the US and Canadian marketplaces.

In 2021, it was revealed that Sezzle had begun operating in the Brazilian market. Also in that same year, US major retailer Target Corporation announced that it had chosen Sezzle as it preferred "Buy Now, Pay Later" partner making it the first top 5 US retailer to partner with a BNPL provider. Also in 2021, Sezzle CEO Charlie Youakim was selected by Worth Magazine as one its distinguished "100 Most Worthy" list for his work to financially empowering young consumers across the world.

In February 2022, Sezzle entered into a binding agreement to be acquired by Australian-owned Zip Co by way of statutory merger, implying Sezzle's value at A$491 million at the time of announcement.

In July 2022, Sezzle and Zip mutually agreed to terminate their previously announced merger agreement for the proposed acquisition of Sezzle by Zip. As part of the mutual termination, Sezzle will receive from Zip U.S. $11 million, to cover, among other things, Sezzle’s legal, accounting, and other costs associated with the transaction.

Platform 
The Sezzle e-commerce payment platform, launched in 2017, enables customers of participating online stores to split the payment for their purchases into four installments. The first installment is paid at the moment of purchase while the other three are due at regular intervals over the following six weeks.

Instead of relying solely on a customer's FICO score for credit risk evaluation, Sezzle's underwriting system assesses each order individually and takes into account multiple factors including a soft credit score check, the customer's order history with Sezzle, and the total purchase amount. The customer's credit score is not impacted. Sezzle's service comes at no added cost to the consumer. Repeat customers who have paid off previous purchases on time are allowed to finance the purchase of more expensive products.

The platform operates as an alternative payment method that the customer selects at checkout to enable payment with participating retailers. Users can also shop and find stores through the Sezzle app and website.

California lending license 
On 30 December 2019 the company introduced a "buy now and pay later" service in California to its customers but the California Department of Business Oversight ruled that the company instead of offering an interest-free pay later service makes loans to its customer. The California Department of Business Oversight stated that Sezzle's involvement with the merchants goes "beyond non-lending relationship yet permitted by California courts, and the credit sales purportedly purchased by Sezzle do not justify Sezzle’s extensive involvement".

On January 17, 2020, the California Department of Business Oversight officially approved Sezzle's application for a lending license to operate within the state of California.

References 

2016 establishments in Minnesota
Financial services companies established in 2016